The COVID-19 lab leak theory, or lab leak hypothesis, is the idea that SARS-CoV-2, the virus that caused the COVID-19 pandemic, is the result of a laboratory leak. Most scientists believe the virus spilled into human populations through natural zoonosis, similar to the SARS-CoV-1 and MERS-CoV outbreaks, and consistent with other pandemics in human history. Available evidence suggests that the SARS-CoV-2 virus was originally harbored by bats, and spread to humans multiple times from infected wild animals at the Huanan Seafood Market in Wuhan, Hubei, China, in December 2019. There is no evidence SARS-CoV-2 existed in any laboratory prior to the pandemic. An original animal reservoir has not yet been confirmed, though several candidate species have been identified. 

Central to many versions of the lab leak theory is suspicion about the proximity of the outbreak to a virology institute that studies coronaviruses, the Wuhan Institute of Virology (WIV). However, most large Chinese cities have laboratories which study coronaviruses and Wuhan is one of the largest cities in China. Virus outbreaks tend to begin in rural areas, but are first noticed in large cities. If a coronavirus outbreak occurs in China, there is a high likelihood it will occur near a large city and therefore near a laboratory studying coronaviruses. The idea of a leak at the WIV also gained support due to secrecy during the Chinese government's response. The idea has been informed by (and has, in turn, fueled) racist and xenophobic sentiments. Scientists from WIV had previously collected SARS-related coronaviruses from bats in the wild; allegations that they also performed undisclosed risky work on such viruses are central to some versions of the idea. Some versions, particularly those alleging genome engineering, are based on misinformation or misrepresentations of scientific evidence.

The idea that the virus was released from a laboratory (accidentally or deliberately) appeared early in the pandemic. It gained popularity in the United States through promotion by conservative figures in spring 2020, fomenting tensions between the U.S. and China. Scientists and media outlets widely dismissed it as a conspiracy theory. The accidental leak idea had a resurgence in 2021. In March, the World Health Organization (WHO) published a report which deemed the possibility "extremely unlikely", though the WHO's director-general said the report's conclusions were not definitive. Subsequent plans for laboratory audits were rejected by China.

Most scientists remain skeptical of a laboratory origin, citing a lack of supporting evidence. A minority of scientists regard both a lab leak and natural origin as equally valid. Some scientists agree a lab leak should be examined as part of ongoing investigations, though politicization remains a concern. In July 2022, two papers published in Science described new epidemiological and genetic evidence that the pandemic likely began at the Huanan Seafood Wholesale Market and did not come from a laboratory. The new evidence led co-author and virologist Edward C. Holmes to declare that "The siren has definitely sounded on the lab leak theory."

Background

The two principal hypotheses for the origin of SARS-CoV-2 is that it either adapted to become infectious to humans through a natural spillover event (zoonosis), or that it escaped from a laboratory where it was being studied. , the best available evidence supports zoonosis.

Zoonosis 
Most new infectious diseases begin with a spillover event from animals, and furthermore, they spillover spontaneously (either by contact with wildlife animals, which are the majority of cases, or with farmed animals). For example, the emergence of Nipah virus in Perak, Malaysia, and the 2002 outbreak of SARS-CoV-1 in Guangdong province, China, were natural zoonosis traced back to wildlife origin. COVID-19 is considered by scientists to be "of probable animal origin". It has been classified as a zoonotic disease (naturally transmissible from animals to humans). Some scientists dispute this classification, since a natural reservoir has not been confirmed. The original source of viral transmission to humans remains unclear, as does whether the virus became pathogenic (capable of causing disease) before or after a spillover event.

Bats, a large reservoir of betacoronaviruses, are considered the most likely natural reservoir of SARS‑CoV‑2. Differences between bat coronaviruses and SARS‑CoV‑2 suggest that humans may have been infected via an intermediate host. Research into the natural reservoir of the virus that caused the 2002 SARS outbreak has resulted in the discovery of many SARS-like coronaviruses circulating in bats, most found in horseshoe bats. Analysis of related viruses indicates that samples taken from Rhinolophus sinicus show a resemblance of 80% to SARS‑CoV‑2. Analysis also indicates that a virus collected from Rhinolophus affinis in a cave near the town of Tongguan in Yunnan province, designated RaTG13, has a 96% resemblance to SARS‑CoV‑2. The RaTG13 virus genome was the closest known sequence to SARS-CoV-2 until the discovery of BANAL-52 in horseshoe bats in Laos, but it is not its direct ancestor. Other closely-related sequences were also identified in samples from local bat populations in Yunnan province. One such virus, RpYN06, shares 97% identity with SARS-CoV-2 in one large part of its genome, but 94% identity overall. Such "chunks" of very highly identical nucleic acids are often implicated as evidence of a common ancestor.

An ancestor of SARS-CoV-2 likely acquired "generalist" binding to several different species through adaptive evolution in bats and an intermediate host species. Estimates based on genomic sequences and contact tracing have placed the origin point of SARS-CoV-2 in humans as between mid-October and mid-November 2019. Some scientists (such as Fauci above and CIRAD's Roger Frutos) have suggested slow, undetected circulation in a smaller number of humans before a threshold event (such as replication in a larger number of hosts in a larger city like Wuhan) could explain an undetected adaption period.

The first known human infections from SARS‑CoV‑2 were discovered in Wuhan, China, in December 2019. Because many of the early infectees were workers at the Huanan Seafood Market, it was originally suggested that the virus might have originated from wild animals sold in the market, including civet cats, raccoon dogs, bats, or pangolins. Subsequent environmental analyses demonstrated the presence of SARS-CoV-2 in the market, with highest prevalence in areas of the market where animals known to be susceptible to SARS-CoV-2 infection were held. Early human cases clustered around the market, and included infections from two separate SARS-CoV-2 lineages. These two lineages demonstrated that the virus was actively infecting a population of animals in the market, and that sustained contact between those animals and humans had allowed for multiple viral transmissions into humans. All early cases of COVID-19 were later shown to be localized to the market and its immediate vicinity.

While other wild animals susceptible to SARS-CoV-2 infection are known to have been sold at Huanan, no bats or pangolins were sold at the market.

Wuhan Institute of Virology 
The Wuhan Institute of Virology and the Wuhan Center for Disease Control are located within miles of the original focal point of the pandemic, Wuhan's Huanan Seafood Wholesale Market, and this has been used to argue in support of the lab leak theory. However, another explanation for this is a tendency to build virology labs in proximity to potential outbreak areas. Proponents of the lab leak theory typically omit to mention that most large Chinese cities have coronavirus research laboratories. Virus outbreaks tend to begin in rural areas, but are first noticed in large cities.

The Wuhan Institute of Virology (WIV) had been conducting research on SARS-like bat coronaviruses since 2005, and was involved in 2015 experiments that some experts (such as Richard Ebright) have characterized as gain-of-function. Others (including Ralph Baric) have disputed the characterization, pointing out that the experiments in question (involving chimeric viruses) were not conducted at the WIV, but at UNC Chapel Hill, whose institutional biosafety committee assessed the experiments as not "gain-of-function". Baric did acknowledge the risks involved in such studies, writing, "Scientific review panels may deem similar studies building chimeric viruses based on circulating strains too risky to pursue ... The potential to prepare for and mitigate future outbreaks must be weighed against the risk of creating more dangerous pathogens."

As early as 2017, some scientists expressed concerns about the risk of pathogens escaping from the WIV. This, along with the fact that the lab is in Wuhan, the city where the pandemic's early outbreak took place, and the fact that the research at WIV was being conducted under the less stringent biosafety levels (BSL) 2 and 3, has led to speculation that SARS-CoV-2 could have escaped from the Wuhan lab. Richard Ebright said one reason that lower-containment BSL-2 laboratories are sometimes used is the cost and inconvenience of high-containment facilities. Australian virologist Danielle Anderson, who was the last foreign scientist to visit the WIV before the pandemic, said the lab "worked in the same way as any other high-containment lab". She also said it had "strict safety protocols". The Huanan Seafood Market may have only served as a jumping off point for a virus that was already circulating in Wuhan, facilitating rapid expansion of the outbreak.

Prior lab leak incidents and conspiracy theories 
Laboratory leak incidents have occurred in the past. A Soviet research facility in 1979 leaked anthrax and at least 68 people died. The 2007 foot-and-mouth outbreak in the UK was caused by a leaky pipe at a high-security laboratory. The SARS virus escaped at least once, and probably twice, from a high-level biocontainment laboratory in China.

Benign exposures to pathogens (which do not result in an infection) are probably under-reported, given the negative consequences of such events on the regulation of a host institution and low risk for widespread epidemics.  Some scientists, such as epidemiologist Marc Lipsitch and bacteriologist Richard Ebright, have asserted that the risk of laboratory-acquired infection (especially with modified pathogens) is greater than widely believed.

No epidemic has ever been caused by the leak of a novel virus. The only incident of a lab-acquired infection leading to an epidemic is the 1977 Russian flu which was probably caused by a leaked strain of H1N1 that had circulated naturally until the 1950s.

Previous novel disease outbreaks, such as AIDS, H1N1, SARS, and the Ebola virus have been the subject of conspiracy theories and allegations that the causative agent was created in or escaped from a laboratory. Each of these is now understood to have a natural origin.

Lab leak theories

There is no evidence that any laboratory had samples of SARS-CoV-2, or a plausible ancestor virus, prior to the start of the COVID-19 pandemic.

Various sources have theorized that SARS-CoV-2 could have leaked from the Wuhan Institute of Virology or another laboratory in Wuhan, such as the Wuhan Center for Disease Control. The theories vary on whether this was an intentional act or an accident. Theories also vary on whether the virus was modified by human activity prior to being released. By January 2020 some lab leak proponents were promoting a narrative with conspiracist components; such narratives were often supported using "racist tropes that suggest that epidemiological, genetic, or other scientific data had been purposefully withheld or altered to obscure the origin of the virus." David Gorski refers to "the blatant anti-Chinese racism and xenophobia behind lab leak, whose proponents often ascribe a nefarious coverup to the Chinese government".

Accidental release of a natural virus 
Some have theorized the virus arose in humans from an accidental infection of laboratory workers by contact with a sample extracted from a wild animal or by direct contact with a captive animal or its respiratory droplets or feces. According to a number of scientists, including Ian Lipkin, the Wuhan Institute of Virology performed work on chimeric SARS-like coronaviruses using inadequate safety procedures.

Former CDC director Robert R. Redfield said in March 2021 that in his opinion the most likely cause of the virus was a laboratory escape, which "doesn't imply any intentionality", and that as a virologist, he did not believe it made "biological sense" for the virus to be so "efficient in human to human transmission" from the early outbreak. The fact that scientists have not been successful in finding an intermediate host that picked up the virus from bats and passed it to humans is seen by some as evidence that supports a lab leak, according to The Guardian. CNN aired a response from Anthony Fauci saying that the virus could have adapted itself for "efficient spread" among humans in two ways, either "in the lab", or via the more likely possibility of "below the radar" community spread going unnoticed for several weeks or months before it was first recognized clinically. University of Utah virologist Stephen Goldstein has criticized the scientific basis of Redfield's comments, saying that SARS-CoV-2's spike protein is very effective at jumping between hosts, so this ability to transmit efficiently among humans is not particularly unusual. Goldstein noted "If a human virus can transmit among mink, there's no basis to assume a bat virus can't transmit among humans. Us humans may think we're very special – but to a virus we are just another mammalian host."

WHO assessment 
The WHO-convened Global Study of Origins of SARS-CoV-2, written by a joint team of Chinese and international scientists and published in March 2021, assessed introduction through a laboratory incident to be "extremely unlikely" and not supported by any available evidence, although the report stated that this possibility could not be wholly ruled out without further evidence. The report stated that human spillover via an intermediate animal host was the most likely explanation, with direct spillover from bats next most likely. Introduction through the food supply chain and the Huanan Seafood Market was considered less likely.

A small group of researchers said that they would not trust the report's conclusions because it was overseen by the Chinese government, and some observers felt the WHO's statement was premature. Other scientists found the report convincing, and said there was no evidence of a laboratory origin for the virus.

WHO Director-General Tedros Adhanom stated that the team had experienced difficulty accessing raw data on early COVID-19 cases and that the least likely hypothesis, a lab leak, required additional investigation because "further data and studies will be needed to reach more robust conclusions". The leader of the WHO investigatory team, Peter Ben Embarek, stated that although the team had been under political pressure from both inside and outside China, he had not felt pressed to remove anything from the final report. He later said that he supported further investigation into the lab leak idea because of the way the Chinese government had "tried to suppress all research in this area". In August 2021 he said "An employee of the lab gets infected while working in a bat cave collecting samples. Such a scenario, while being a lab leak, would also fit our first hypothesis of direct transmission of the virus from bat to human."

The United States, European Union, and 13 other countries criticized the WHO-convened study, calling for transparency from China and access to the raw data and original samples. Chinese officials described these criticisms as "an attempt to politicise the study". Scientists involved in the WHO report, including Liang Wannian, John Watson, and Peter Daszak, objected to the criticism, and said that the report was an example of the collaboration and dialogue required to successfully continue investigations into the matter.

On 15 July 2021, WHO Director-General Tedros Adhanom Ghebreyesus said that the COVID-19 lab leak theory had been prematurely discarded by the WHO, following his earlier statements that a potential leak requires "further investigation, potentially with additional missions involving specialist experts". He proposed a second phase of WHO investigation, which he said should take a closer look at the lab leak idea, and asked China to be "transparent" and release relevant data. Later on 17 July, Tedros called for "audits of relevant laboratories and research institutions" in the area of the initial COVID-19 cases. China refused saying it showed "disrespect" and "arrogance towards science". The United States criticised China's position on the follow-up origin probe as "irresponsible" and "dangerous".

In June 2022, the WHO's Scientific Advisory Group for Origins of Novel Pathogens (SAGO) published a preliminary report urged a deeper investigation into the possibility of a laboratory leak. The SAGO chair said in a press conference that "the strongest evidence is still around a zoonotic transmission". The AP described the report as a "sharp reversal" of the WHO's previous assessment, and Science.org described reactions from academics as mixed.

Mojiang copper mine 
Members of DRASTIC, a collection of internet activists vociferously supporting the lab leak idea, have raised concerns over a respiratory outbreak that happened in the spring of 2012 near an abandoned copper mine in China, which Shi Zhengli's group investigated. Shi's group collected a sample of viral RNA and named it RaBtCoV/4991. Later, Shi's group published a paper about a virus named RaTG13 in Nature in February 2020. Via sequence comparisons, it became clear that RaBtCoV/4991 and RaTG13 were likely the same virus. Shi has said that the renaming was done to reflect the origin location and year of the virus.

Some proponents, including Nicholas Wade and pseudonymous DRASTIC member TheSeeker268, have argued that the renaming was an attempt to obscure the origins of the virus and hide how it could be related to a laboratory origin of the related SARS-CoV-2 virus. Scientists have said that RaTG-13 is too distantly related to be connected to the pandemic's origins, and could not be altered in a laboratory to create SARS-CoV-2. The New Yorker has described this series of events as an "odd" omission, and reported clarifications made thereafter by Shi's group and the WIV. Nature later published an addendum to the 2020 RaTG13 paper addressing any possible link to the mine, in which Shi says that the virus was collected there, but that it was very likely not the cause of the miners' illnesses. Laboratory tests conducted on the workers' serum were negative, and "no antibodies to a SARS-like coronavirus had been found."

Accidental release of a genetically modified virus 

One idea used to support a laboratory origin invokes previous gain-of-function research on coronaviruses. The exact meaning of "gain of function" is disputed among experts. According to emailed statements by Shi Zhengli, director of the Center for Emerging Infectious Diseases at the Wuhan Institute of Virology, her lab has not conducted any unpublished gain-of-function experiments on coronaviruses, and all WIV staff and students tested negative for the virus in the early days of the pandemic.

Furin cleavage site 

Some claims of bioengineering focus on the presence of two sequential cytosine-guanine-guanine (CGG) codons in the virus' RNA, more precisely in the crucial furin cleavage site. The CGG codon is one of several codons that translates into an arginine amino acid, and it is the least common arginine codon in human pathogenic betacoronaviruses. Partially, this lack of CGG codons in human pathogenic coronaviruses is due to natural selection: B-cells in the human body recognize areas on virus genomes where C and G are next to each other (so-called CpG islands). The CGG codon makes up 5% of the arginine codons in the SARS-CoV-1 genome, and it makes up 3% of the arginine codons in the SARS-CoV-2 genome. Proponents of an engineered virus, including journalist Nicholas Wade, say that two such uncommon codons in a row are evidence for a laboratory experiment; because of the low chance of a CGG codon pair occurring in nature, and in contrast, the common usage of CGG codons for arginine in genetic engineering work. This has been debunked by scientists, who note that the CGG codon is also present (and even more frequent) in other coronaviruses, including MERS-CoV, and that a codon being rare does not mean it cannot be present naturally. If the CGG codon had been engineered into the virus, it should mutate out of the virus as it circulates in humans in the wild over several years, but the opposite has occurred. In fact, the presence of the furin cleavage site, which is responsible for a significant increase in transmissibility, largely outweighs any disadvantageous immune responses from B-cells triggered by the genetic sequences which code for it.

Another source of speculation is the mere presence of the furin cleavage site. It is absent in the closest known relatives of SARS-CoV-2 (but present in other betacoronaviruses e.g. BtHpCoV-ZJ13). This anomaly is most probably the result of recombination, and is further unsurprising since the genetic lineage of these viruses has not been adequately explored, sampled, or sequenced. A common occurrence amongst other coronaviruses, including MERS-CoV, HCoV-OC43, HCoV-HKU1, and appearing in near-identical fashion in HKU9-1, the site is preceded by short palindromic sequences suggestive of natural recombination caused by simple evolutionary mechanisms. Additionally, the suboptimal configuration and poor targeting of the cleavage site for humans or mice when compared with known examples (such as HCoV-OC43 or HCoV-HKU1), along with the complex and onerous molecular biology work this would have required, is inconsistent with what would be expected from an engineered virus.

Project DEFUSE was a rejected DARPA grant application, that proposed to sample bat coronaviruses from various locations in China. The rejected proposal document was leaked to the press by DRASTIC in September 2021. Co-investigators on the rejected proposal included the EcoHealth Alliance's Peter Daszak, Ralph Baric from UNC, Linfa Wang from Duke–NUS Medical School in Singapore, and Shi Zhengli from the Wuhan Institute of Virology. The grantees proposed to evaluate the ability of bat viruses to infect human cells in the laboratory using chimeric coronaviruses which were mutated in different locations, and to create protein-based vaccines out of the spike (S) protein (not the whole virus) which would be distributed to bats in the wild to reduce the chances of future human outbreaks. One proposed alteration was to modify bat coronaviruses to insert a cleavage site for the Furin protease at the S1/S2 junction of the spike (S) viral protein. There is no evidence that any genetic manipulation or reverse genetics (a technique required to make chimeric viruses) of SARS-related bat coronaviruses was ever carried out at the WIV. All available evidence points to the SARS-CoV-2 furin cleavage site being the result of natural evolution.

Government oversight 
The situation reignited a debate over gain-of-function research, although the intense political rhetoric surrounding the issue has threatened to sideline serious inquiry over policy in this domain. Researchers have said the politicization of the debate is making the process more difficult, and that words are often twisted to become "fodder for conspiracy theories." The idea of an experiment conducted in 2015 on SARS-like coronaviruses being the source of the pandemic was reported in British tabloids early in the pandemic. Virologist Angela Rasmussen writes that this is unlikely, due to the intense scrutiny and government oversight gain-of-function research is subject to, and that it is improbable that research on hard-to-obtain coronaviruses could occur under the radar.

Kentucky Senator Rand Paul alleged that the US National Institutes of Health (NIH) had been funding gain-of-function research in Wuhan, accusing researchers including epidemiologist Ralph Baric of creating "super-viruses". Both Fauci and NIH Director Francis Collins denied that the US government supported such research. Baric likewise rejected Paul's allegations, saying his lab's research into cross-species transmission of bat coronaviruses did not qualify as gain-of-function. While a 2017 study of chimeric bat coronaviruses at the WIV listed NIH as a sponsor, NIH funding was only related to sample collection. A Washington Post fact-checker commented that "EcoHealth funding was not related to the experiments, but the collection of samples", and that "statements about Baric's research appear overblown". In October 2021, a spokesman for the NIH acknowledged that the EcoHealth Alliance had provided new data demonstrating that in a mouse experiment, a coronavirus had caused more weight loss than expected. This was described as an unexpected consequence of the research, and not its intended outcome or a component of the original funding proposal. Importantly, the NIH spokesman said this finding was provided in a late progress report, and was not available before prior statements about experiments at the WIV.

An August 2021 interim report authored by the minority staff of the Republican members of the US House Foreign Affairs Committee asserted that a laboratory leak origin for SARS-CoV-2 was more likely than a natural one. The report alleged that SARS-CoV-2 emerged in humans as a result of gain-of-function research made on the RaTG13 virus, collected in a cave in Yunnan province in 2012, which was afterwards accidentally released some time before 12 September 2019, when the database of the Wuhan Institute of Virology went offline. The August 2021 report relies mostly on existing public evidence, combined with internal documents from the CCP from before and during the early days of the pandemic. The interim report was published coinciding with a joint investigation from ProPublica and Vanity Fair. Immediately following its publication, the report was heavily criticized by experts in diplomacy and the Chinese language for mistranslations and misinterpretations of Chinese documents.  Bacteriologist and lab leak theory proponent Richard Ebright criticized the report for packaging pre-existing and previously examined evidence as new information. Evolutionary biologist Michael Worobey commented that the document seemed to be either "a cynical effort to try to win Republican votes" in the imminent midterm elections, or "a bunch of staffers with no ability to understand the science who stumbled across a bunch of misinformation and disinformation-filled tweets." Virologist Angela Rasmussen described the report as "an embarrassingly bad use of taxpayer money and resources."

Intelligence agencies 
That same month, an intelligence probe on the origins of COVID-19 requested by President Biden assessed that the Chinese government did not have foreknowledge of the outbreak. Overall, the probe did not render conclusive results on the origins. Of eight assembled teams, one (the Federal Bureau of Investigation) leaned towards a lab leak theory, four others (and the National Intelligence Council) were inclined to uphold a zoonotic origin, and three were unable to reach a conclusion. British intelligence agencies believe it is "feasible" that the virus began with a leak from a Chinese laboratory. 

In February 2023,  The Wall Street Journal reported that Director of National Intelligence Avril Haines's office provided to the White House and key members of Congress a classified update (to a 2021 report) which noted that the US Energy Department, based on new intelligence, had shifted its view from "undecided" to "low confidence" that the pandemic originated with a lab leak. White House National Security Advisor Jake Sullivan responded to the report saying "some elements of the intelligence community have reached conclusions on one side, some on the other. A number of them have said they just don't have enough information to be sure", and there was still "no definitive answer" to the pandemic origins' question. The report renewed the political debate around the issue in the US.

Fringe views on genetic engineering 

The earliest known recorded mention of any type of lab leak theory appeared in the form of a tweet published on 5 January 2020, from a Hong Kong user named @GarboHK, insinuating that the Chinese government had created a new virus and intentionally released it. Similar ideas were later formalized in a preprint posted on BioRxiv on 31 January 2020, by researchers at the Indian Institute of Technology, claiming to find similarities between the new coronavirus' genome and that of HIV. The paper was quickly retracted due to irregularities in the researchers' "technical approach and...interpretation of the results". This claim was notably promoted by Luc Montagnier, a controversial French virologist and Nobel laureate, who contended that SARS-CoV-2 might have been created during research on a HIV/AIDS vaccine. Bioinformatics analyses show that the common sequences are short, that their similarity is insufficient to support the hypothesis of common origin, and that the identified sequences were independent insertions which occurred at varied points during the evolution of coronaviruses.

Further claims were promulgated by several anti-vaccine activists, such as Judy Mikovits and James Lyons-Weiler, who claimed that SARS-CoV-2 was created in a laboratory, with Mikovits going further and stating that the virus was both deliberately engineered and deliberately released. Weiler's analysis, where he argued that a long sequence in the middle of the spike protein of the virus was not found in other coronaviruses and was evidence for laboratory recombination, was dismissed by scientists, who found that the sequence in question was also found in many other coronaviruses, suggesting that it was "widely spread" in nature.

Chinese researcher Li-Meng Yan was an early proponent of deliberate genetic engineering, releasing widely criticised preprint papers in favor of the theory in the spring of 2020. After she released her preprints, political operatives (including Steve Bannon and Guo Wengui) arranged for Yan to flee to the United States in the summer of 2020 to engage in a speaking tour on right-wing media outlets, as a method of distracting from the Trump administration's handling of the COVID-19 pandemic. According to scientific reviewers from the Johns Hopkins Center for Health Security, Yan's paper offered "contradictory and inaccurate information that does not support their argument," while reviewers from MIT Press's Rapid Reviews: COVID-19 criticised her preprints as not demonstrating "sufficient scientific evidence to support [their] claims."

In September 2022, a panel assembled by The Lancet published a wide-ranging report on the pandemic, including commentary on the virus origin overseen by the group's chairman Jeffrey Sachs. This suggested that the virus may have originated from an American laboratory, a notion long-promoted by Sachs, including on the podcast of conspiracy theorist Robert F. Kennedy Jr. Reacting to this, virologist Angela Rasmussen commented that this may have been "one of The Lancet's most shameful moments regarding its role as a steward and leader in communicating crucial findings about science and medicine". Virologist David Robertson said the suggestion of US laboratory involvement was "wild speculation" and that "it's really disappointing to see such a potentially influential report contributing to further misinformation on such an important topic".

Deliberate release

Historian of science Naomi Oreskes says that she does not know of any credible scientists who support the view that the virus was released deliberately, while the version proposing the virus may have escaped accidentally is more plausible.

Developments in 2022 
In June 2022, the WHO released a report advocating for more investigation into the lab leak theory. In response, Chinese Foreign Ministry spokesperson Zhao Lijian called the lab leak theory "a lie concocted by anti-China forces for political purposes, which has nothing to do with science".

In July 2022, two articles appeared in the journal Science analyzing all available epidemiological and genetic evidence from the earliest known cases in Wuhan. Based on two different analyses, the authors of both papers concluded that the outbreak began at the Huanan Seafood Wholesale Market and was unconnected to any laboratory. A third manuscript (a pre-print) examined RNA samples taken directly from the market in the spring of 2020 and detected SARS-CoV-2 RNA in environmental samples collected from animal stalls and sewage wells at the market. The RNA detected was highly similar to viruses which infected early outbreak patients who became sick after being present at the market. No virus was detected in any samples taken directly from animals at the market. University of Sydney virologist and co-author of both publications Edward C. Holmes commented that "The siren has definitely sounded on the lab leak theory" and "There's no emails. There's no evidence in any of the science. There's absolutely nothing".

Political and media attention
The first media reports suggesting a SARS-CoV-2 lab leak appeared in the Daily Mail and The Washington Times in late January 2020. In a 31 January 2020 interview with Science Magazine, Professor Richard Ebright said there was a possibility that SARS-CoV-2 entered humans through a laboratory accident in Wuhan, and that all data on the genome sequence and properties of the virus were "consistent with entry into the human population as either a natural accident or a laboratory accident". A 5 February 2021 report from Caixin described these reports as rumors originating from two sources: a preprint paper by an Indian scholar posted to bioRxiv that was later withdrawn, and a BBC China report. On 8 February 2023, the acting director of the US National Institutes of Health (NIH) testified before a Republican-led House committee that the viruses studied in the Wuhan lab "bear no relationship" to SARS-CoV-2 and that suggesting equivalency would be akin to "saying that a human is equivalent to a cow".

In early 2021, the hypothesis returned to popular debate due to renewed media discussion. The renewed interest was prompted by two events. First, an article published in May by The Wall Street Journal reported that lab workers at the Wuhan Institute of Virology fell ill with COVID-19-like symptoms in November 2019. The report was based on off-the-record briefings with intelligence officials. The cases would precede official reports from the Chinese government stating the first known cases were in December 2019, although unpublished government data suggested the earliest cases were detected in mid-November. The Guardian stated that the WSJ article did little to confirm, in terms of good, quality evidence, the possibility of a lab leak; a declassified report from the National Intelligence Council likewise said that the fact the researchers were hospitalized was unrelated to the origins of the outbreak. Second, it was shown that Peter Daszak, the key organiser of the February 2020 statement in The Lancet, did not disclose connections to the Wuhan Institute of Virology. An addendum was later published by The Lancet, in which Daszak listed his previous cooperation with Chinese researchers.

After the publication of the WHO-convened report, politicians, talk show hosts, journalists, and some scientists advanced claims that SARS-CoV-2 may have come from the WIV. DRASTIC also contributed to its promotion, particularly via Twitter. In July 2021, a Harvard–Politico survey indicated that 52 percent of Americans believed that COVID-19 originated from a lab leak, while 28 percent believed that COVID-19 originated from an infected animal in nature. By March 2023, the percentage of Americans believing in lab origin had doubled (from 30% to 60%) since 3 years earlier, and the percentage of Americans believing in natural origins had halved (from 40% to 20% ).

After May 2021, some media organizations softened previous language that described the laboratory leak theory as "debunked" or a "conspiracy theory". However, the prevailing scientific view remained that while an accidental leak was possible, it was highly unlikely.

China–US relations 

The origin of COVID-19 became a source of friction in China–United States relations. The lab leak theory was promulgated in early 2020 by United States politicians and media, particularly US president Donald Trump, other prominent Republicans, and conservative media (such as Fox News pundit Tucker Carlson, and former Breitbart News publisher and White House chief strategist Steve Bannon). Trump had also referred to the virus as "kung flu", and the administration also expressed the intention to sanction China. In April 2020, Trump claimed to have evidence for the theory, but refused to produce it when requested. At that time, the media did not distinguish between the accidental lab leak of a natural virus and bio-weapon origin conspiracy theories. In online discussions, various theories – including the lab leak theory – were combined to form larger, baseless conspiracy plots. In May 2020, Fox News host Tucker Carlson accused Anthony Fauci of having "funded the creation of COVID" through gain-of-function research at the Wuhan Institute of Virology (WIV). Citing an essay by science writer Nicholas Wade, Carlson alleged that Fauci had directed research to make bat viruses more infectious to humans. Facebook enacted a policy to remove discussion of the lab leak theory as misinformation; it lifted the ban a year later, in May 2021.

A BBC China report stated that on 14 February, Chinese president Xi Jinping proposed for biosafety to be incorporated into law; the following day, new measures were introduced to "strengthen the management of laboratories", especially those working with viruses. In April 2020, The Guardian reported that China had taken steps to tightly regulate domestic research into the source of the outbreak in an attempt to control the narrative surrounding its origins and encourage speculation that the virus started outside the country. In May 2020, Chinese state media carried statements by scientists countering claims that the seafood market and Institute of Virology were possible origin sites, including comments by George Gao, director of the Chinese Center for Disease Control and Prevention.

In the United States, anti-China misinformation spread on social media, including baseless bio-weapon claims, fueled aggressive rhetoric towards people of Asian ancestry, and the bullying of scientists. Some scientists were worried their words would be misconstrued and used to support racist rhetoric. In a letter published in Science, a number of scientists, including Ralph S. Baric, argued that the accidental laboratory leak hypothesis had not been sufficiently investigated and remained possible, calling for greater clarity and additional data. Their letter was criticized by some virologists and public health experts, who said that a "hostile" and "divisive" focus on the WIV was unsupported by evidence, was impeding inquiries into legitimate concerns about China's pandemic response and transparency by combining them with speculative and meritless argument, and would cause Chinese scientists and authorities to share less rather than more data.

Fort Detrick 
Some members of the Chinese government have promoted a counter-conspiracy theory claiming that SARS‑CoV‑2 originated in the U.S. military installation at Fort Detrick. This theory has little support. Chinese demands to investigate U.S. laboratories are thought to be a distracting technique to push focus away from Wuhan.

Chilling effects 

According to Paul Thacker (writing for the British Medical Journal), some scientists and reporters said that "objective consideration of COVID-19's origins went awry early in the pandemic, as researchers who were funded to study viruses with pandemic potential launched a campaign labelling the lab leak hypothesis as a 'conspiracy theory.'" In February 2020, a letter was published in The Lancet authored by 27 scientists and spearheaded by Peter Daszak which described some alternate origin ideas as "conspiracy theories". Filippa Lentzos said some scientists "closed ranks" as a result, fearing for their careers and grants. The letter was criticized by Jamie Metzl for "scientific propaganda and thuggery", and by Katherine Eban as having had a "chilling effect" on scientific research and the scientific community by implying that scientists who "bring up the lab-leak theory ... are doing the work of conspiracy theorists".

Early in 2020, scientists including Jeremy Farrar, Kristian G. Andersen, and Robert F. Garry, among others, sent emails to Anthony Fauci with questions regarding the lab leak theory, and suspicions that some evidence supported it. NIH director Francis Collins was concerned at the time that discussion of the possibility could damage "international harmony". After the discovery of similar viruses in nature, more research into the genome, and the availability of more genomic sequences from the early days of the pandemic, these scientists publicly stated they supported the zoonotic theory as the most likely explanation.

Some journalists and scientists said they dismissed or avoided discussing the lab leak theory during the first year of the pandemic as a result of perceived polarization resulting from Donald Trump's embrace of the theory. The chair of the Board of Governors of the American Academy of Microbiology, Arturo Casadevall, said that, he (like many others) previously underestimated the lab leak hypothesis "mainly because the emphasis then [early in the pandemic] was on the idea of a deliberately engineered virus". However, by May 2021 it was a "long-simmering concern" in scientific circles, and that he perceived "greater openness" to it. 

By fall 2022, most scientists were convinced, based on available evidence, that the pandemic most likely began with a natural zoonosis. The most likely natural reservoir is believed to reside in bats, with a possible intermediate host (such as palm civets, minks, or pangolins), before spillover into humans. In March 2023 James Alwine and colleagues argued that continuing to frame the lab leak hypothesis as being as likely as natural spillover was responsible for a misdirection of scientific effort, which could compromise progress towards preparing for future pandemics.

References

External links
 Declassified report from the National Intelligence Council (Executive summary)
 The Origins of COVID-19: an investigation of the Wuhan Institute of Virology - report by US House Foreign Affairs Committee Minority Staff
 World Health Organisation report on the origins of COVID-19

2020 controversies
2021 controversies
2022 controversies
2023 controversies
Scientific and technical responses to the COVID-19 pandemic
Occupational safety and health
Biology controversies
Controversies in China